Dalsfjord is a former municipality in the Sunnmøre region of Møre og Romsdal county, Norway.  The former municipality existed from 1924 until its dissolution in 1964.  The  municipality included the area around the Dalsfjorden between Vanylven Municipality in the west and almost all the way to the Kilsfjorden in the east.  The area is now a part of Volda Municipality. The administrative centre was the village of Dravlaus. Other villages in the area included Ulvestadbygda (Ulvestad, Lauvstad, and Sætre), Åmelfot, Steinsvik, and Dalsbygda.

History
Originally, Dalsfjord was a part of Volda Municipality (see formannskapsdistrikt law), the parish of Dalsfjord was established as a separate municipality on 1 July 1924. Initially, Dalsfjord had a population of 960. During the 1960s, there were many municipal mergers across Norway due to the work of the Schei Committee. On 1 January 1964, Dalsfjord (population: 1,151) ceased to exist as a municipality when it was merged back into Volda.

Government

The municipal council  of Dalsfjord was made up of 17 representatives that were elected to four year terms.  The party breakdown of the final municipal council was as follows:

See also
List of former municipalities of Norway

References

Volda
Sunnmøre
Former municipalities of Norway
1924 establishments in Norway
1964 disestablishments in Norway